Grundy Mountain or Mount Grundy, a mountain of the Great Dividing Range, is located on the Northern Tablelands of New South Wales, Australia.

The native vegetation of the mountain has mostly been cleared for farming and pine plantations. However, there are remnant areas of eucalyptus forest with the rare Purple Pepperbush. Of special note is the cool temperate rainforest at the head of the Tia River. It includes geographically isolated plants such as the Southern Sassafras, White Mountain Banksia, Mountain Walnut and the Black Olive Berry. A new lizard species in the genus Lampropholis was discovered on Mount Grundy in 1995.

See also

List of mountains of New South Wales

References

Grundy
Forests of New South Wales
New England (New South Wales)